Mikael Westling (born 10 June 1964) is a retired Swedish ice hockey player. Westling was part of the Djurgården Swedish champions' team of 1983.

References

Swedish ice hockey players
Djurgårdens IF Hockey players
1964 births
Living people